Area code 302 is a telephone area code in the North American Numbering Plan (NANP) for the U.S. state of Delaware. It is Delaware's only area code, and was assigned in 1947 as one of the original North American area codes.

Despite the rapid growth in telecommunication services in the northern part of the state, area code 302 is not projected to exhaust its numbering pool until 2033.

Prior to October 2021, area code 302 had telephone numbers assigned for the central office code 988. In 2020, 988 was designated nationwide as a dialing code for the National Suicide Prevention Lifeline, which created a conflict for exchanges that permit seven-digit dialing. This area code was therefore scheduled to transition to ten-digit dialing by October 24, 2021.

Delaware shares a LATA with Philadelphia and the Pennsylvania side of the Delaware Valley.

Central office prefixes 
Unless otherwise stated, most of the prefixes were introduced on or before February 4, 1994. Prefixes located in the Ocean View area also serve Bethany Beach, Millville and Fenwick Island. 976 is assigned to Wilmington, and requires dialling "1+302" first.

References

External links

302
302
Telecommunications-related introductions in 1947